La Hora Lunática (The Crazy Hour) was a daily one-hour live TV show aired on Telemundo. It was the first TV show to win in its time slot over its strongest competitor on Univisión. The show featured the talents of "Humberto Luna", Mario Ramírez Reyes "El Comodín", "Hugo Armando" & Jackie Torres who welcomed Tito Puente, "Celia Cruz", Marc Anthony, "Julio Iglesias", "Antonio Aguilar", "Vicky Carr" & many more international stars. The show also featured the talents of Belkis Proenza, Miguel Angel MasJuan, Luis Enrique De Los Cobos, Lucio Arroyo and singer Sylvia Flores.  Jackie Torres produced the show from 1995 until 1996 when she welcomed Mario Proenza as the new producer.

References

Telemundo original programming